National Lampoon may refer to:

National Lampoon (magazine), the original humor magazine from 1970 to 1998, and those spinoffs that directly related to the magazine:
National Lampoon Lemmings, a 1973 stage show
The National Lampoon Radio Hour, produced from 1973 to 1974
National Lampoon's Animal House, a 1978 film, also based upon stories from the magazine
National Lampoon's Movie Madness, a 1981 film
National Lampoon's Class Reunion, a 1983 film
National Lampoon's Vacation (film series), a series of comedy films based upon stories written for National Lampoon magazine
National Lampoon's Joy of Sex, a 1984 film
National Lampoon's Christmas Vacation, a 1989 film
Loaded Weapon 1, a 1993 film sometimes known as National Lampoon's Loaded Weapon 1
National Lampoon's Senior Trip, a 1995 film
National Lampoon's Van Wilder, a 2002 film
National Lampoon, Incorporated, a company formed in 2002 which licensed out all subsequent productions that went under the National Lampoon name
National Lampoon's Christmas Vacation 2, a 2003 film

See also
List of National Lampoon films
J2 Communications, owner of the National Lampoon brand and properties from 1991 to 2002
The Harvard Lampoon
Lampoon (disambiguation)